Yohan García (born 24 March 1982) is a former Cuban swimmer who competed in the 2000 Summer Olympics.

References

1982 births
Living people
Cuban male swimmers
Male butterfly swimmers
Olympic swimmers of Cuba
Swimmers at the 1999 Pan American Games
Swimmers at the 2000 Summer Olympics
Central American and Caribbean Games gold medalists for Cuba
Competitors at the 1998 Central American and Caribbean Games
Central American and Caribbean Games medalists in swimming
Pan American Games competitors for Cuba
21st-century Cuban people